Mazal Zamedi (also Romanized as Maz‘al Ẕamedī; also known as Maz‘al Bandeh) is a village in Chenaneh Rural District, Fath Olmobin District, Shush County, Khuzestan Province, Iran. At the 2006 census, its population was 371, in 51 families.

References 

Populated places in Shush County